Im Schatten der Ärzte ("In the shadow of Die Ärzte") is the second studio album by German rock band Die Ärzte.

Track listing
 "Du willst mich küssen" ("You want to kiss me") – 3:08
 "Dein Vampyr" ("Your vampyre") – 3:18
 "... und es regnet" ("...and it's raining") – 3:29
 "Alles" ("Everything") – 2:55
 "Rennen nicht laufen!" ("Run, don't walk!") – 2:52
 "Wie ein Kind" ("Like a child") – 3:35
 "Wie ein Kind (Reprise)" – 0:28
 "Wegen dir" ("Because of you") – 3:14
 "Die Antwort bist du" ("You are the answer") – 3:17
 "Buddy Holly's Brille" ("Buddy Holly's glasses") – 3:36
 "Käfer" ("Beetle") – 2:52
 "Ich weiß nicht (ob es Liebe ist)" ("I don't know (if it's love)") – 3:47
 "Was hat der Junge doch für Nerven" ("What nerve that boy has") – 4:14

Singles
1985: "Wegen dir"
1986: "Du willst mich küssen"

Personnel
Farin Urlaub - guitar, vocals
Bela B. Felsenheimer - drums, vocals
Hans "Sahnie" Runge - bass guitar, vocals
Nena - additional vocals on 1

Charts

References

1985 albums
Die Ärzte albums
German-language albums